I Wanna Be with You may refer to:
I Wanna Be with You (album), a 2000 album by Mandy Moore
"I Wanna Be with You" (Mandy Moore song), 2000
"I Wanna Be with You" (Raspberries song), 1972
"I Wanna Be with You" (The Isley Brothers song), 1979
"I Wanna Be with You" (DJ Khaled song), 2013
"I Wanna Be with You", a song by Backstreet Boys from their self titled 1996 album
"I Wanna B with U", a 1995 song by Fun Factory
"I Wanna Be With You", a song by Bruce Springsteen from Tracks